Beerwah may refer to:

Beerwah, Queensland, a small town on the hinterland Sunshine Coast, Queensland, Australia, at the side of the Glass House Mountains National Park
Mount Beerwah, the tallest of the Glass House Mountains
Beerwah, Jammu and Kashmir, a town in India